Minamoto no Muneyuki (Japanese: 源 宗于 also 源宗于朝臣 Minamoto no Muneyuki Ason) (?-939) was an early Heian waka poet and nobleman. He was a grandson of Emperor Kōkō.

In 894 he was reduced to being a commoner, holding a few provincial governships. However, in 939 he was appointed as a magistrate and died shortly after. 

He is designated a member of the Thirty-six Poetry Immortals, and one of his poems is included in the famous anthology Hyakunin Isshu (Poem 28). In total we find 15 of his poems in the Japanese Imperial anthologies, 6 of which can be found in the Kokin Wakashū.

His remaining works include a poetry collection known as the Muneyukishū (宗于集).

External links 
E-text of his poems in Japanese
Bridge of dreams: the Mary Griggs Burke collection of Japanese art, a catalog from The Metropolitan Museum of Art Libraries (fully available online as PDF), which contains material on Minamoto no Muneyuki (see index)

References 

Japanese poets
Minamoto clan
983 deaths
Year of birth unknown
People of Heian-period Japan
Hyakunin Isshu poets